This List of works by Walter Gilbert includes the works of Walter Gilbert alone and those done in collaboration with other individuals such as Louis Weingartner, both with the Bromsgrove Guild and Martyns of Cheltenham. He also worked with his son, Donald Gilbert, and H. H. Martyn.

Early works

With Louis Weingartner and the Bromsgrove Guild

With Donald Gilbert and Martyns of Cheltenham

War memorials

With Louis Weingartner and Bromsgrove Guild

With Louis Weingartner and Martyns of Cheltenham

With his son Donald Gilbert and H. H. Martyn

Gallery

References

Further reading
 Phillip Medhurst, "Walter Gilbert: The Romance in Metalwork".  (paperback)  (Kindle) http://www.createspace.com/3995376

External links
 Comprehensive list of works

English sculptors
English male sculptors
Gilbert, Walter
Modern sculptors